Mahmood Baqi Moulvi is a Pakistani politician who is currently serving as a member of the National Assembly from NA-245 (Karachi East-IV). He was also a Special Assistant to the Prime Minister for Maritime Affairs.

Political career

2018
Moulvi ran to be a member of the National Assembly of Pakistan from NA-255 (Karachi Central-III), but was unsuccessful. He was defeated by Khalid Maqbool Siddiqui, the Convenor of the Muttahida Qaumi Movement - Pakistan.

†MQM-P is considered heir apparent to MQM

2022
Moulvi was elected to the National Assembly of Pakistan from Constituency NA-245 (Karachi East-IV) as a candidate of Pakistan Tehreek-e-Insaf in a by-election held on 21 August 2022.

He was notified by the Election Commission of Pakistan on 2 September 2022, but took oath on 20 February 2023.

See also
 List of members of the 15th National Assembly of Pakistan

References

External links
 
 Mahmood Moulvi's business website

Living people
Pakistan Tehreek-e-Insaf MNAs
Politicians from Karachi
Pakistani Muslims
Muhajir people
Year of birth missing (living people)